The Scorching Adventures of the Screaming Jets EP is the debut release by Australian pub rock band The Screaming Jets, released in December 1990.

The Screaming Jets won a national Battle of the Bands contest run by the Triple J network in 1989 and won time in a recording studio to release this EP in 1990.

The song "C'Mon" earned the Screaming Jets a nomination for 'best new talent' at the ARIA Music Awards of 1991. The song lost to Archie Roach's - "Charcoal Lane"

Track listing

References

External links
 "The Scorching Adventures of the Screaming Jets" at Discogs

The Screaming Jets albums
1990 debut EPs
EPs by Australian artists